The 2022–23 season is the 130th season in the existence of Gillingham Football Club and the club's first season back in League Two since the 2012–13 season following their relegation from League One last season. In addition to the league, they will also compete in the 2022–23 FA Cup, the 2022–23 EFL Cup and the 2022–23 EFL Trophy.

Transfers

In

Out

Loans in

Loans out

Pre-season and friendlies
The Gills announced their first pre-season friendly with a trip to Folkestone Invicta on 2 July. A week later, the club announced two further fixtures to their schedule with a trip to Dover Athletic and a visit from Portsmouth to Priestfield Stadium. A trip to Deal Town was confirmed shortly afterwards. A Gills XI was soon announced to have a trip to Chatham Town and a trip to Ramsgate, the latter on the same date as the Portsmouth friendly. A seventh friendly, against Southend United was confirmed on 1 June. On July 13, the Gills added another addition to the schedule with Crystal Palace visiting the Priestfield Stadium.

Competitions

Overall record

League Two

League table

Results summary

Results by round

Matches

On 23 June, the league fixtures were announced.

FA Cup

Gillingham were drawn away to AFC Fylde in the first round, to Dagenham & Redbridge in the second round and at home to Leicester City in the third round.

EFL Cup

Gills were drawn away to AFC Wimbledon in the first round and at home to Exeter City in the second round. An away tie against Wolverhampton Wanderers was drawn for the fourth round.

EFL Trophy

On 21 June, the initial group stage draw was made, grouping Gillingham with Charlton Athletic and Colchester United. Three days later, Brighton & Hove Albion U21s joined Southern Group A.

References

Gillingham F.C. seasons
Gillingham
2020s in Kent